Los Agentes secretos contra Guante Verde (English language:The Secret Agents Against Green Glove) is a 1974 Argentine drama film directed and written by Alberto Abdala and Sergio L. Mottola. The film starred Tito Alonso.

Cast
 Tito Alonso
 Rey Charol
 Luis Cordara
 Mónica Escudero
 Mónica Grey
 Arturo Noal
 Juan Ramón
 Raúl Ricutti
 Daniel Ripari
 Perla Santalla
 Mario Savino
 Walter Soubrie
 Nino Udine
 Guadalupe

Release
The film premiered on 15 October 1974 in Buenos Aires.

External links 
 

Argentine drama films
1974 films
1970s Spanish-language films
1974 drama films
1970s Argentine films